The Upstarts: How Uber, Airbnb, and the Killer Companies of the New Silicon Valley Are Changing the World is a 2017 book by journalist Brad Stone. It chronicles the founding of companies such as Uber and Airbnb, and investigates the evolution of the Silicon Valley.

References 

2017 non-fiction books
Books about the San Francisco Bay Area
Books about globalization
Little, Brown and Company books